Govindapur  is a village development committee in Parsa District in the Narayani Zone of southern Nepal. At the time of the 2011 Nepal census it had a population of 2,897 people living in 443 individual households. There were 1,465 males and 1,432 females at the time of census.

References

Populated places in Parsa District